WINB is a brokered Christian shortwave radio station licensed to Red Lion, Pennsylvania, in the United States.  WINB began broadcasting in October 1962, making it the oldest private shortwave radio station in the United States that is still in operation. In the 1960s, the station was notable for its criticism of American domestic and foreign policy, leading to the government freezing the expansion of private shortwave radio transmission schedules for several years.

References

External links
WINB's official website
WINB's listing on the FCC's website

INB
Shortwave radio stations in the United States
Radio stations established in 1962